The 1999 USC Trojans football team represented the University of Southern California (USC) in the 1999 NCAA Division I-A football season. In their second year under head coach Paul Hackett, the Trojans compiled a 6-6 record (3–5 against conference opponents), finished in a tie for sixth place in the Pacific-10 Conference (Pac-10), and outscored their opponents by a combined total of 348 to 278.

Quarterback Mike Van Raaphorst led the team in passing, completing 139 of 258 passes for 1,758 yards with eight touchdowns and nine interceptions.  Chad Morton led the team in rushing with 262 carries for 1,141 yards and 15 touchdowns. Kareem Kelly led the team in receiving yards with 54 catches for 902 yards and four touchdowns.

Schedule

Roster

Rankings

Coaching staff

Awards
All-Pac-10: OL Travis Claridge, DB David Gibson

References

USC
USC Trojans football seasons
USC Trojans football